Amphitrite was launched at Whitby in 1790.  A French privateer captured her in 1794, but the Royal Navy recaptured her. She spent much of her career as a West Indiaman, finishing as a London transport. She was last listed in 1810 or 1811.

Career
Lloyd's Register for 1790 showed Amphitrite with C.Pearson, master, James Atty, owner, and trade Liverpool–Riga. The next year her owners changed her registry to Jersey.

Lloyd's Register for 1794–95 showed Amphitrite with P.Tardiff, master, C.Epriox, owner, and trade London–Jamaica.

Lloyd's List (LL) reported on 23 December 1794 that a privateer had captured Amphitrite, Tardiff, master, about six miles from the east end of Jamaica. Amphitrite had been sailing from London to Jamaica. 

Then on 17 November 1794,  recaptured Amphrite.  shared in the reward. Lloyd's List reported that the recapture took place off the Virginia Capes and that Amphitrite had been "much plundered". Lloyd's List later reported that Amphitrite, Tardiff, master, had arrived at Antigua. The report credited the capture to Cleopatra.

Fate
Amphitrite was last listed in 1810 (Lloyd's Register) or 1811 (Register of Shipping)

Citations and references
Citations

References
  

1790 ships
Ships built in Whitby
Age of Sail merchant ships of England
Captured ships